The  West Texas Roughnecks season was the team's eighth season as a professional indoor football franchise and second in the Indoor Football League (IFL). One of twenty-two teams competing in the IFL for the 2011 season, the Odessa, Texas-based West Texas Roughnecks were members of the Lonestar Division of the Intense Conference.

Regular season

Schedule

*  = Kickoff Classic Weekend, before week 1 starts.

** = Replacement Team.

Standings

Postseason

Schedule

Roster

References

2011 Indoor Football League season
2011 in sports in Texas